The Quebrada del Barro Formation is a geological formation of the Marayes-El Carrizal Basin in San Juan Province, Argentina. This formation is the most fossiliferous portion of the Triassic Marayes Group, and is also the youngest unit of the group, overlying the El Carrizal Formation. An unconformity at the top of the Quebrada del Barro Formation separates it from the Cretaceous-age Los Riscos Formation of the El Gigante Group. Part of the formation may be made into a provincial park following the discovery of the fossils of Ingentia, a giant sauropodomorph dinosaur which helped elucidate the early evolution of sauropods.

Sedimentology 
The Quebrada del Barro Formation formed within a rift basin during a period of renewed fracturing. It encompasses  of red sandstones, fine conglomerates, and diamictites. Early hypotheses on the depositional environment proposed that the sediments formed in an alluvial fan or braided river system, while a newer proposal outlines how four different facies within the formation can be used to reconstruct a meandering semiarid floodplain deposited by mudflows and discharging in heterolithic terminal splays.

Fossil content 
The fauna of Quebrada del Barro is similar to that of the neighboring Los Colorados Formation which is considered to be from the Norian stage of the Late Triassic. Both formations preserve fossils from groups such as sauropodomorph dinosaurs, cynodonts, and testudinatans. However, Quebrada del Barro is more abundant in sphenodontians (Sphenotitan), tritheledontid cynodonts, and coelophysoid dinosaurs (Lucianovenator), while sauropodomorphs are somewhat less common and aetosaurs are completely absent, in contrast to the Los Colorados Formation. Sphenodontians and cynodonts are also abundant in microfossil assemblages. In addition, the Quebrada del Barro Formation preserves some of the only pterosaur and Dromomeron specimens known from Triassic strata in Argentina. Although the sphenodontian and cynodont-dominated fauna of Quebrada del Barro is akin to that of the Faxinal del Sotorno assemblage of the Brazilian Caturrita Formation, the fauna of the Faxinal del Sotorno assemblage is otherwise indicative of an older part of the Triassic than the Quebrada del Barro Formation.

Dinosaurs

Other avemetatarsalians

Pseudosuchians

Rhynchocephalians

Other reptiles

Synapsids

References

Bibliography 
 

Geologic formations of Argentina
Triassic System of South America
Late Triassic South America
Triassic Argentina
Norian Stage
Sandstone formations
Siltstone formations
Alluvial deposits
Fluvial deposits
Fossiliferous stratigraphic units of South America
Paleontology in Argentina
Geology of San Juan Province, Argentina